The University of Guayaquil (Spanish: Universidad de Guayaquil), known colloquially as the Estatal (i.e., "the State [University]"), is a public university in Guayaquil, Guayas Province, Ecuador.

Estatal was founded in 1883. It is the oldest university in the city of Guayaquil and has the largest student body (over 80,000 students). It operates six extension universities throughout the country.

See also

List of universities in Ecuador

References

External links
 ug.edu.ec, university's website
 Universidad de Guayaquil

 
Buildings and structures in Guayaquil
Universities in Ecuador